TV Novel: Dear My Sister (lit. "My Sister Bok-hee") is a 2011 South Korean television series starring Jang Mi-inae, Ryu Tae-joon, and Choi Chang-yeob. The morning soap opera aired on KBS2 on November 7, 2011 to May 4, 2012 from Mondays to Fridays at 09:00 for 130 episodes.

Dear My Sister is the continuation of the TV Novel series after Glory of Youth stopped airing on KBS1 in April 2009.

Plot
Han Bok-hee is a girl who studies very hard and works at a brewery. When she was five years old, her parents divorced and Bok-hee went to live with her mother. Her father died in a coal mine accident.

Her mother Yoon Jung-ae got remarried to Song Byung-man, the owner of Dukchun, a brewery company. Although Bok-hee addresses her mother as "aunt" in public, people later learn that Bok-hee is Jung-ae's daughter. As a result, her stepbrother Bok-nam is sent to an orphanage, and Bok-hee leaves for Seoul.

Kang Joon-mo worked as a stuntman, but due to injury had to quit his job. He comes to Dukchun to work as a temporary teacher. Joon-mo meets Bok-hee for the first time when she peers through the window of a classroom in which he's teaching. Joon-mo sees the passion in Bok-hee's eyes and becomes her mentor.

Cast
Song family
Jang Mi-inae as Han Bok-hee
Jung Ji-in as young Bok-hee
Kim Ji-young as Choi Gan-nan (Bok-hee's step-grandmother)
Lee Hyo-jung as Song Byung-man (Bok-hee's step-father)
Kyeon Mi-ri as Yoon Jung-ae (Bok-hee's mother)
Chae Min-hee as Song Mi-ja (Byung-man's younger sister)
Bae Dong-sung as Yang Mal-goo (driver and Mi-ja's husband)
Choi Chang-yeob as Han Bok-nam (Bok-hee's half-brother)
In Ji-won as young Bok-nam
Kim Yoo-ri as Song Geum-joo (Byung-man's oldest child)
Seo Ji-seung as young Geum-joo
Yuk Dong-il as Song Tae-joo (Byung-man's second child)
Kim Ki-hyun as young Tae-joo
Seo Hae-rim as Song Eun-joo (Byung-man's youngest child)
Kim Yoo-ri as young Eun-joo

Brewery people
Choi Woo-suk as Ji Young-pyo
Kwak Jung-wook as young Young-pyo
Im Seung-dae as Bae Dal-bong
Kim Na-woon as Choi Jeom-rye (housemaid)

Hospital people
Ryu Tae-joon as Kang Joon-mo (Bok-hee's teacher and In-sook's younger brother)
Han Jung-gook as Kim Jin-gook (doctor)
Kwon Kyung-ha as Kang In-sook (nurse and doctor's wife)
Kim Si-ohn as Kim Min-soo (Joon-mo's nephew)
Lee Ji-oh as young Min-soo

Yeongmisa people
Seo Seung-man as Kwon Yong-sool
Kim Sun-eun as Ko Bong-soo
Kim Hyun-ah as Cha Pil-soon
Park Hee-eun as Gong Ok-ja

Extended cast
Lee Je-in as Lee Eun-young
Jo Sun-hyung as Hong Baek-goo
Ryohei Otani as Baek Tae-woong 
Kwang Hoon as university student

See also
Korean Broadcasting System

References

External links
Dear My Sister official KBS website 

Korean Broadcasting System television dramas
2011 South Korean television series debuts
2012 South Korean television series endings
Korean-language television shows
South Korean romance television series